The Riverview School District is a small, suburban public school district serving the Pittsburgh suburbs of Oakmont, Pennsylvania and Verona, Pennsylvania.  Riverview School District encompasses approximately 2 square miles. According to 2014 federal census data, it serves a resident population of 8,900. In 2015, the district residents' per capita income was $31,812, while the median family income was $50,701.Riverview Jr-Sr High School is a small, 1st-tier Pittsburgh district serving the towns of Oakmont and Verona.

Schools

High School: Riverview Junior-Senior High School
Elementary School(s): Tenth Street Elementary School and Verner Elementary School

Student clubs and extracurriculars
Amnesty International, Art Club, Chorus, Dance Club, Designer's Club, Drama Club, Ecology Club, French Club, History Club,  Jr High Student Council,  SAEM, Key Club,  Model UN, National Honor Society, PJAS. REAP, SADD, Spanish Club, Student Council, Yearbook.

References

School districts in Allegheny County, Pennsylvania
Educational institutions with year of establishment missing